Gillian Timothy Jurcher (born 9 April 1997) is a German professional footballer who plays as a centre-forward or right winger.

References

Living people
1997 births
German footballers
Footballers from Hamburg
Association football forwards
Association football wingers
Hamburger SV II players
VfB Germania Halberstadt players
1. FC Saarbrücken players
SV Waldhof Mannheim players
Regionalliga players
3. Liga players
21st-century German people